The following buildings were added to the National Register of Historic Places as part of the Homestead Multiple Property Submission (or MPS).

Gallery

See also
National Register of Historic Places listings in Miami-Dade County, Florida

References

Homestead
National Register of Historic Places Multiple Property Submissions in Florida
Miami-Dade County, Florida
1988 establishments in Florida